The Fire and Faggot Parliament was an English Parliament held in May 1414 during the reign of Henry V.  It was held in Grey Friars Priory in Leicester, and the Speaker was Walter Hungerford. It is named for passing the Suppression of Heresy Act, which called for burning the Lollards with bundles of sticks ("faggots").

The decision was inspired by the 1199 decretal Vergentis in senium of Pope Innocent III. The Parliament also confirmed Archbishop Arundel's policy of licensing books for publication:

The king received the rights to “Tonnage and Poundage” for life from this Parliament.  This precedent was continued for all Monarchs until the Useless Parliament in 1625 when Charles I was granted the right for only one year.

References

Lollardy
1414 establishments in England
1414 disestablishments
15th-century English parliaments
History of Leicester